The Jersey Devils were an American professional ice hockey team based in Cherry Hill, New Jersey.

The Devils were formed when the Philadelphia Ramblers, a member of the Eastern Hockey League, relocated to Cherry Hill at the end of the 1963–64 season. The Devils played in the Cherry Hill Arena until 1973, when the team folded along with the Eastern Hockey League (EHL).

The Devils had several notable players and also won the highest scoring game in EHL history, a 16–15 win over the Syracuse Blazers on February 24, 1968, at the Cherry Hill Arena before 4,583 fans.

The EHL split into two fairly short-lived leagues. The Northern teams became the North American Hockey League, while the Southern teams became the Southern Hockey League, however the Devils, who had been the southernmost franchise in the Northern Division of the EHL, did not join either.

Notable players, coaches and owners
 Bobby Taylor, who was later a backup goalie for the Philadelphia Flyers under Bernie Parent. He later became a color commentator on radio and television hockey broadcasts for the Flyers (1976–1992) and then the Tampa Bay Lightning (beginning in 1993); he has announced that he would retire from his position on the Lightning telecasts once the 2014–15 season ends.
 Dick Sarrazin, who later played for the Philadelphia Flyers and two WHA teams in the late 1960s and early 1970s.
 Marcel Pelletier, a former NHL goaltender, who ended his twenty-year career as a player/coach with the Devils in 1969.
 Rosaire Paiement played the 1966–67 season, scoring 125 points. He later played for the Philadelphia Flyers and Vancouver Canucks in the NHL and for several WHA teams.
 Vic Stasiuk, the Philadelphia Flyers second head coach was head coach of the Devils for two seasons, 1966–68.
 Gary Gresdal, who led the EHL in penalties in 1971–72 with 392 minutes. He played briefly for the Quebec Nordiques in the WHA.
 Larry Pleau, 1968–69 North Division Rookie of the Year who later played several seasons with the Montreal Canadiens. He also appeared for the United States Olympic hockey team in 1968 and the New England Whalers in the WHA before working as their coach and in the front office of the Saint Louis Blues for 13 years.
 Jamie Kennedy, 1970–71 North Division First Team All-Star Center who played briefly for the New York Raiders in the World Hockey Association. He is also a member of the Prince Edward Island Hall of Fame.
 John Brophy, all time EHL career leader in penalty minutes (3822), who played his final season as a Devil in 1972–73. He later coached for one season (1978–79) for Birmingham Bulls of the WHA and three (1986–89) with the Toronto Maple Leafs.
 Jerome Burg, Owner and President of the Jersey Devils during the final years from 1971–73. He later moved to Arizona where he became a radio personality.

Season-by-season record
Note: GP = Games played, W = Wins, L = Losses, T = Ties, Pts = Points, GF = Goals for, GA = Goals against, PIM = Penalties in minutes

References

External links
 Jersey Devils historical information
 Scans of the Jersey Devils media guides

Cherry Hill, New Jersey
Eastern Hockey League teams
Defunct ice hockey teams in the United States
Ice hockey teams in New Jersey
Philadelphia Flyers minor league affiliates